Sikka Thermal Power Station is one of Gujarat's coal-fired power plants. It is located near Jamnagar which is the major industrial town in Gujarat.

Power plant
Sikka Thermal Power Station is located near Jamnagar, which is the major industrial town in Gujarat. There was two units of 120 MW capacity each is recently decommissioned and two 250 MW unit is operational.

Installed capacity

See also

References 

Coal-fired power stations in Gujarat
Jamnagar
1988 establishments in Gujarat
Energy infrastructure completed in 1988
20th-century architecture in India